Martin Vingaard (born 20 March 1985) is a Danish former professional footballer who played as a midfielder. He currently manages the under-17 team of FC Copenhagen.

Club career
Vingaard was born in Odense, Denmark, and grew up in the suburb of Fangel. After a strong season with his club FC Copenhagen, Vingaard was one of the nominees for Danish Football Player of the Year 2010, an award eventually won by teammate and captain William Kvist.

On 22 April 2019, Vingaard signed for the rest of the season with HB Køge. His retirement from football was announced on 16 July 2020.

International career
He scored his first goal for the Denmark national football team in the friendly match against Poland on 1 June 2008.

Coaching career
At the end of July 2020, he was appointed under-17s assistant coach of his former club, FC Copenhagen. On 21 December 2021 Copenhagen confirmed, that Vingaard had taken charge of the clubs under-15 team. He took over as head coach of the under-17s in September 2022.

Honours
Copenhagen
 Danish Superliga: 2008–09, 2009–10, 2010–11, 2012–13
 Danish Cup: 2008–09, 2011–12

Individual
 Tipsbladet Player of the Spring: 2018

References

External links
  
 
 Martin Vingaard on DBU 
 Official Danish Superliga stats 

1985 births
Living people
Danish men's footballers
Danish expatriate men's footballers
Denmark international footballers
Esbjerg fB players
F.C. Copenhagen players
FC Nordsjælland players
Tampa Bay Rowdies players
HB Køge players
Danish Superliga players
Danish 1st Division players
North American Soccer League players
USL Championship players
Denmark youth international footballers
Denmark under-21 international footballers
Footballers from Odense
Association football midfielders
Boldklubben 1913 players
Danish expatriate sportspeople in the United States
Expatriate soccer players in the United States
Dalum IF players